State Highway 47 (SH 47)  runs from FM 60 near Easterwood Airport and Texas A&M University Research Park in College Station to SH 21 at Texas A&M University-Riverside near Bryan. This highway was designated on January 28, 1987.

Previous routes

SH 47 was originally planned on August 21, 1923, along a previous section of SH 1A and SH 1C from near the intersection of the Texas, Arkansas, and Louisiana state borders, northwest through Atlanta, then northeast through Texarkana to the Arkansas border north of Texarkana. On June 24, 1931, the highway was rerouted west from Atlanta to Daingerfield, replacing SH 48, while the old route southeast of Atlanta became part of SH 77 On April 19, 1938, SH 47 Bypass was designated from SH 47 to SH 1. SH 47 Bypass extended north to SH 5 on October 24, 1938. On September 26, 1939, this classification was canceled when the route was transferred to SH 11. SH 47 Bypass became Loop 14.

Junction list

References

047
Transportation in Brazos County, Texas
Bryan, Texas
College Station, Texas